Elections to the second Odisha Legislative Assembly were held 1957.

Constituencies
The elections were held for 140 seats of 101 constituencies. 62 constituencies were single-member while 39 constituencies were two-member constituencies. Out of 101 constituencies, 25 were reserved for Scheduled Caste, while 18 were reserved for Scheduled Tribe. A total of 517 candidates contested for these 140 seats.

Political Parties
Three national parties, Communist Party of India, Congress and Praja Socialist Party along with the state party Ganatantra Parishad took part in the assembly election. Congress party emerged again as the winner by winning 40% of the seats with a vote share of 38.26%. Harekrushna Mahatab again become the Chief Minister of the state.

Results

!colspan=10|
|- style="background-color:#E9E9E9; text-align:center;"
!colspan=2|Party !! Flag !! Seats  Contested !! Won !! Net Change  in seats !! % of  Seats
! Votes !! Vote % !! Change in vote %
|- style="background: #90EE90;"
| 
| 
| 140 || 56 ||  11 || 40.00 || 16,28,180 || 38.26 ||  0.39
|-
| 
|
| 109 || 51 ||  20 || 36.43 || 12,23,014 || 28.74 ||  8.24
|-
| 
|
| 46 || 11 || New || 7.86 || 4,42,508 || 10.40 || New
|-
| 
| 
| 43 || 9 ||  2 || 6.43 || 3,57,659 || 8.40 ||  2.78
|-
| 
|
| 179 || 13 ||  11 || 9.29 || 6,04,652 || 14.21 || N/A
|- class="unsortable" style="background-color:#E9E9E9"
! colspan = 3|
! style="text-align:center;" |Total Seats !! 140 ( 0) !! style="text-align:center;" |Voters !! 1,24,67,800 !! style="text-align:center;" |Turnout !! colspan = 2|42,56,013 (34.14%)
|}

Elected members

See also
 1957 elections in India
 1952 Odisha Legislative Assembly election

References

State Assembly elections in Odisha
Odisha
1950s in Orissa